Leiolepis triploida, also known as the Thai butterfly lizard or Malaysian butterfly lizard, is a species of agamid lizard that is all-female (parthenogenetic). It is found in Southern Thailand and Peninsular Malaysia.

Description
Leiolepis triploida measure  in snout–vent length. It is a triploid species and reproduces asexually. Its likely maternal ancestor is Leiolepis boehmei, an asexual but diploid species; the two are morphologically similar but L. triploida is larger.

References

Leiolepis
Reptiles of Thailand
Reptiles of Malaysia
Reptiles described in 1971